Allie is a unisex given name, a nickname and, more rarely a surname. It is a diminutive form of several names beginning with Al-. It may refer to:

Given name or nickname

Female
 Allie (wrestler) (born 1987), Canadian professional wrestler
 Allie Bailey (born 1993), American soccer player
 Allie Bates (born 1957), American short story writer
 Allie Brosh (born 1985), American blogger
 Allie May Carpenter (1887–1978), American artist
 Allie Lewis Clapp, American television host
 Allie Clifton (born 1988), American journalist
 Alexandria Allie DeBerry (born 1994), American actress and model
 Alviola Allie Luse Dick (1859-1933), American music teacher
 Alexandra Allie DiMeco (born 1992), American actress and musician
 Allie Vibert Douglas (1894–1988), Canadian astronomer and first Canadian woman astrophysicist
 Allie Eagle (born 1949), New Zealand artist
 Alvira "Allie" Earp, common-law wife of Virgil Earp (1843–1905), American Old West lawman
 Allie Esiri (born 1967), British writer
 Allison Allie Goertz (born 1991), American singer-songwriter and comedian
 Alyssa Allie Gonino (born 1989 or 1990), American actress
 Allie Grant (born 1994), American actress
 Allie Hann-McCurdy (born 1987), Canadian ice dancer
 Allie Hixson (1924–2007), American feminist
 Allie Kieffer (born 1987), American athlete
 Alexandra Allie Kiick (born 1995), American tennis player
 Allie LaForce (born 1988), American journalist
 Allie B. Latimer (born 1929), first woman and first African-American to serve as General Counsel of a major United States federal agency
 Allie Legg (born 1989), American cyclist
 Allie Light, American film producer
 Alexandra Allie Long (born 1987), American soccer player 
 Alexandra Allie MacDonald (born 1988), Canadian actress
 Allie Beth Martin (1914–1976), American librarian, educator, politician and author
 Allie Moss, American songwriter
 Allie Ostrander (born 1996), American long-distance runner
 Alexandria Allie Quigley (born 1986), American–Hungarian Women's National Basketball Association player
 Alexandra Rout (born 1993), New Zealand figure skater and former national champion
 Allie Rowbottom (born 1986), American writer
 Allie Beth Stuckey (born 1992), American blogger
 Allie Tennant (1892–1971), American sculptor
 Allie Thunstrom (born 1988), American speed skater and former ice hockey player
 Alexandria Allie Trimm (born 1994), American actress
 Allie Will (born 1991), American tennis player
 Allie X (born 1985), Canadian singer-songwriter

Male
 Alfred Allie Clark (1923–2012), American Major League Baseball player
 Allie Craycraft (born 1932), American former politician
 Albert Allie Lampard (1885–1984), Australian cricketer
 Alfred Allie McGuire (born 1951), American former basketball player
 Albert Allie Miller (1886–1959), American college football player and head coach
 Alvin Allie Morrison (1904–1966), American freestyle wrestler, 1928 Olympic gold medalist and national champion
 Alva Allie Paine (1919–2008), American basketball player
 Allie Reynolds (1917–1994), American Major League Baseball pitcher
 Alex Allie Sherman (1923–2015), American former National Football League player and head coach
 Allie Edward Stakes Stephens (1900–1973), American politician
 Albert Allie Strobel (1884–1955), American Major League Baseball player
 Thomas Allison Allie White (1915–1996), American football player
 Elias Allie Wrubel (1905–1973), American composer and songwriter

Fictional characters
 Allie Caulfield, Holden Caulfield's dead brother in the novel The Catcher in the Rye by J.D. Salinger
 Allie Fox, from the book The Mosquito Coast and its movie adaptation
 Allison "Allie" Hamilton, a fictional character from the novel The Notebook and its movie adaptation
 Allie Keys, in the science fiction miniseries Taken, played by Dakota Fanning
 Allison "Allie" Lowell, one of the lead characters in the American TV series Kate & Allie
 Allie Novak, a fictional character from the Australian drama series Wentworth
 Ahalya "Allie" Rajan, a fictional character in the television series CSI: Vegas

Surname
 Gair Allie (born 1931), American Major League Baseball player in 1954
 Nazeer Allie (born 1985), South African footballer
 Scott Allie, American comics writer and editor, editor-in-chief of Dark Horse Comics from 2012 to 2015

See also 
 Alphonse Malangone (born 1936), New York City mobster nicknamed "Allie Shades"
 Alexandra
 Alexis (given name)
 Ali (name)
 Allee, given name and surname
 Ally (name)

References 

Hypocorisms
Unisex given names
English unisex given names